Fairview is a city in Multnomah County, Oregon,  United States. As of the 2010 census, the city population was 8,920.

History
Members of the Multnomah tribe of Chinookan Indians lived in a village near the Columbia River (the future site of Fairview) when the Lewis and Clark Expedition visited the area in 1806. By the 1840s and 1850s, white settlers began hay, grain, and livestock operations in what would become eastern Multnomah County. Railroad tracks extended to the area by the 1890s, and, as the population grew, residents began referring to the locale as Fairview because of the pleasing views of the nearby river, the Columbia River Gorge, and Mount Hood. Since another community named Fairview already existed on the Oregon Coast, the community's first post office was named Cleone until the coastal post office closed and the name was transferred to Fairview.

In the mid-1980s, the city attempted to annex a large section of unincorporated territory in eastern Multnomah County. The plan would have created a city of about 120,000 residents, which at the time would have ranked as the second most populous city in Oregon, behind only Portland. In September 1985, the Oregon Supreme Court ruled that the attempt was invalid as state law required two cities to start any attempt at consolidation, and only Fairview had initiated this attempt.

A large Fairview employer is Townsend Farms, which operates a berry freezing cannery. In 2020 the company had approximately 350 employees in the region, with 450 seasonal workers; it was the source of a Hepatitis A outbreak in pomegranate seeds in 2013 that infected 127 people in 8 states. The product was recalled under its Townsend Farms brand at Costco and private labeled at Harris Teeter, and later linked to Goknur Foodstuffs Import Export Trading in Turkey by the FDA. The cannery itself had a COVID-19 outbreak in 2020, which may have caused two waves of infections affecting at least 48 people. The cannery did not shut down, and the outbreak spread for weeks before the state was notified. The company has blueberry orchards in Applegate Valley near Grants Pass and Cornelius, as well as others in Oregon and Washington.

Geography

Demographics

2010 census
As of the census of 2010, there were 8,920 people, 3,544 households, and 2,274 families residing in the city. The racial makeup of the city was 73.1% White, 4.6% African American, 1.1% Native American, 5.5% Asian, 1.0% Pacific Islander, 9.7% from other races, and 5.0% from two or more races. Hispanic or Latino of any race were 16.4% of the population.

There were 3,544 households, of which 32.2% had children under the age of 18 living with them, 43.9% were married couples living together, 14.4% had a female householder with no husband present, 5.9% had a male householder with no wife present, and 35.8% were non-families. 26.7% of all households were made up of individuals, and 6.8% had someone living alone who was 65 years of age or older. The average household size was 2.51 and the average family size was 3.04.

The median age in the city was 35 years. 23.8% of residents were under the age of 18; 10.2% were between the ages of 18 and 24; 29.6% were from 25 to 44; 26.2% were from 45 to 64; and 10% were 65 years of age or older. The gender makeup of the city was 48.1% male and 51.9% female.

2000 census
As of the census of 2000, there were 7,561 people, 2,831 households, and 1,936 families residing in the city. The population density was 2,360.8 people per square mile (912.3/km2). There were 3,116 housing units at an average density of 972.9 per square mile (376.0/km2). The racial makeup of the city was 76.21% White, 3.44% Asian, 3.04% African American, 0.83% Native American, 0.37% Pacific Islander, 10.51% from other races, and 5.59% from two or more races. 16% of the population were Hispanic or Latino of any race.
l
There were 2,831 households, out of which 36.0% had children under the age of 18 living with them, 49.9% were married couples living together, 13.3% had a female householder with no husband present, and 31.6% were non-families. 22.6% of all households were made up of individuals, and 5.3% had someone living alone who was 65 years of age or older. The average household size was 2.67 and the average family size was 3.13.

In the city, the population was spread out, with 28.1% under the age of 18, 11.3% from 18 to 24, 33.7% from 25 to 44, 19.5% from 45 to 64, and 7.4% who were 65 years of age or older. The median age was 30 years. For every 100 females, there were 102.7 males. For every 100 females age 18 and over, there were 102.1 males.

The median income for a household in the city was $40,931, and the median income for a family was $43,317. Males had a median income of $37,342 versus $25,909 for females. The per capita income for the city was $19,006. About 13.5% of families and 19.1% of the population were below the poverty line, including 26.1% of those under age 18 and 12.4% of those age 65 or over.

Government
House District 49 encompasses the city of Fairview, as well as surrounding cities of Troutdale, Wood Village, and parts of Gresham. It is represented by Democrat Chris Gorsek.

As part of House District 49, Fairview is also part of Senate District 25 (composed of House Districts 49 and 50) represented by Democrat Laurie Monnes Anderson.

Education
Fairview is served by the Reynolds School District. Fairview Elementary, Salish Ponds Elementary, Woodland Elementary, and Reynolds Middle School are in the city.

Transportation

TriMet
Fairview is served by two Trimet bus lines: 21-Sandy Blvd/233rd and 77-Broadway/Halsey.

Major Highways
Interstate 84
U.S. Route 30

See also
 Fairview Woods Park

References

External links
 City of Fairview (official website)
 Entry for Fairview in the Oregon Blue Book

Cities in Oregon
Cities in Multnomah County, Oregon
1908 establishments in Oregon
Populated places established in 1908
Portland metropolitan area
Oregon populated places on the Columbia River